Captain Oscar Aloysius Patrick Heron  (17 September 1896 – 5 August 1933) was an Irish World War I flying ace of the British Royal Air Force, credited with thirteen confirmed aerial victories. He later served in the Irish Air Corps, until killed in a flying accident.

Early life and background
Heron was born in Armagh, Ireland, the eldest of three sons born to Charles and Annie Heron. His father was the principal of St. Patrick's Boys School, while his mother headed the girls' section. The family lived in Banbrook Hill, and the 1911 census lists Oscar and his two brothers John and Charles, their parents, his mother's father Jeremiah McKenna, a cook, and two servant girls as residing there.

World War I

Flying activities

Heron served for a period in the Connaught Rangers, before being commissioned from cadet to temporary second lieutenant (on probation) in the Royal Flying Corps on 13 December 1917. He was assigned to No. 70 Squadron to fly the Sopwith Camel single-seat fighter in May 1918. On 30 June, he gained his first victories, driving down an Albatros D.V and setting another ablaze. It would not be until 19 August that he would win again, when he destroyed a Fokker D.VII on an evening patrol. Again, there would be over a month's lapse, until he destroyed another Fokker D.VII on 28 September. On 1 October, Heron became an ace by destroying the only two-seater on his list; on the 7th he accounted for two more D.VII's, and three more on the 9th. For one of these, Heron cooperated with Captain Sydney Liversedge, Lieutenant Kenneth Watson and two other pilots to force down and capture a Fokker. Heron was appointed a flight commander with the temporary rank of captain on 23 October, going on to gain three more victories, two on 26 October, and his thirteenth and last on the 28th. In the end, besides the captured aircraft, Heron destroyed ten enemy machines and drove down two out of control.

Heron was subsequently awarded the Distinguished Flying Cross, which was gazetted on 7 February 1919. His citation read:
Second Lieutenant (Acting Captain) Oscar Alois Patrick Heron.
"An officer conspicuous for his skill and daring in aerial combats. He has accounted for eight enemy aeroplanes. On 28th September he attacked, single-handed, three Fokkers; one of these he shot down. On another occasion he, in company with five other machines, engaged six Fokkers, all six being destroyed, 2nd Lt. Heron accounting for two."

On 15 July 1919 Heron was granted permission to wear the Croix de guerre conferred by Belgium.

List of aerial victories

Post-war career
Heron was transferred to the RAF's unemployed list on 10 August 1919, but was granted a short service commission with the rank of flying officer two months later on 24 October. He served in No. 3 Squadron RAF based in Ambala, India, from 1 April 1921. On 7 November 1922, on completion of his period of service, Heron was transferred to the Reserve of Air Force Officers. He then returned to Ireland to join the National Army Air Service, which became the Air Corps in 1924, and served as an instructor based at Baldonnel Airfield. He finally relinquished his RAF Reserve commission on 7 November 1926.

Death
Heron was killed on 5 August 1933 while taking part in a mock aerial combat over Phoenix Park, Dublin, for Irish Aviation Day. Three days before, during practice flights, two aircraft collided, killing Lieutenant J. P. Twohig. Heron acted a pall-bearer at Twohig's funeral on the morning of the event. In the display Heron flew a Vickers Vespa, fighting off an attack by three Avro Cadets. Heron and his air gunner were pulled from the wreckage, but he died almost immediately, while the air-gunner, Private Richard Tobin, died the following day. Heron was buried with full military honours at Glasnevin Cemetery on 8 August.

References
Notes

Bibliography
 

1896 births
1933 deaths
People from Armagh (city)
Connaught Rangers soldiers
Royal Flying Corps officers
Royal Air Force personnel of World War I
Irish World War I flying aces
Irish Air Corps personnel
Aviators killed in aviation accidents or incidents
Victims of aviation accidents or incidents in Ireland
Victims of aviation accidents or incidents in 1933